Sirukumab (INN, USAN) (developmental code name CNTO-136, tentative brand name Plivensia) is a human monoclonal antibody designed for the treatment of rheumatoid arthritis. It acts against the proinflammatory cytokine Interleukin 6 (IL-6).

Sirukumab is currently under development by Johnson & Johnson's subsidiary Centocor.

Clinical trials

Rheumatoid arthritis
It has started clinical trials. and reported some phase II results.

In December 2015 three phase III trials (SIRROUND-D, -H and -T) were collecting data.
By Feb 2017 SIRROUND-D was considered to have met both co-primary endpoints.

Other
The drug was previously under development for the treatment of depression.

See also
 Anti-IL-6

References

Janssen Biotech